Ramachandra Gowda (Kannada:ರಾಮಚಂದ್ರ ಗೌಡ) is a senior leader of the Bharatiya Janata Party (BJP) in Karnataka, India., Gowda took to social-political activities during his school days having been inspired by the Rashtriya Swayamsevak Sangh.
He participated in the Goa Liberation Movement when in high school. Later, he became an active member of the erstwhile Bharatiya Jana Sangh. He entered the Bangalore City Corporation as a Jana Sangh member in 1970. He was elected to the City Improvement Trust Board in the same year.

He was also the BJP State unit general secretary for a long period. He was first elected to the Karnataka Legislative Council from the Bangalore Graduates Constituency in 1988 and has been re-elected 3 more times in 1994, 2000 and 2006. He held the portfolios of Small Savings, Mining & Geology and Science & Technology in the BJP and Janata Dal (Secular) coalition headed by H.D.Kumaraswamy. It was during his tenure as minister that the state imposed a ban on lottery. In the BJP Government headed by B.S. Yeddyurappa, he held the portfolio of Medical Education. He resigned in September 2010 after his name figured in a Medical Colleges recruitment scam. for which high court gave a clean chit clearing all allegations. Subsequently, he has been appointed as the Deputy chairman of the State Planning Board.

Personal life
Born on 13 December 1938 at Tippoor in Kunigal taluk of Tumkur district, he holds an engineering degree. He has one son and one daughter.

References 
Ramachandra gowda's personal website 

Bharatiya Janata Party politicians from Karnataka
Politicians from Bangalore
People from Tumkur district
1938 births
Members of the Karnataka Legislative Council
State cabinet ministers of Karnataka
Living people
Goa liberation activists
Bharatiya Jana Sangh politicians